Financial Reporting Standards Board (FRSB) is a board of New Zealand Institute of Chartered Accountants. Its objective is to develop, revise and maintain definite accounting standards and providing guidance through research bulletins or technical practice aids in all aspects of financial reporting. FRSB forwards new accounting standards to the Accounting Standards Review Board (ASRB) for approval. It also works with the International Accounting Standards Board (IASB).

See also
New Zealand Conceptual Framework

External links 
Financial Reporting Standards Board Developments

Accounting in New Zealand
Accounting organizations
Accounting standards
Standards of New Zealand